Khudiram Bose Central College, established in 1965, is a central undergraduate college in Kolkata, West Bengal, India. It offers only courses in arts and commerce. It is affiliated with the University of Calcutta.

Departments

Arts, Commerce and Science

Bengali
English
History
Political Science
Philosophy
Education
Commerce
Geography
Journalism and Mass Communication
Hindi

Accreditation
Khudiram Bose Central College is recognized by the University Grants Commission (UGC). Recently, it has been re-accredited and awarded B grade by the National Assessment and Accreditation Council (NAAC).

See also 
List of colleges affiliated to the University of Calcutta
Education in India
Education in West Bengal

References

External links
 Khudiram Bose Central College

Educational institutions established in 1965
University of Calcutta affiliates
Universities and colleges in Kolkata
1965 establishments in West Bengal